Barbara J. Vigil is an American attorney and jurist who served as an associate justice of the New Mexico Supreme Court from 2012 to 2021.

Early life and education 
Vigil was born and raised in Santa Fe, New Mexico. She earned a Bachelor of Business Administration in Accounting from New Mexico State University and a Juris Doctor from the University of New Mexico School of Law.

Career 
She was elected to the court on November 6, 2012, defeating temporary appointee Paul J. Kennedy and assuming office in December 2012 to fill the remainder of retired Justice Patricio M. Serna's unexpired term. Vigil was retained by voters in a retention election on November 8, 2016. Her current term will expire in 2024. In April 2021, she announced her retirement effective June 30, 2021. Prior to being elected to the bench, Vigil operated a private practice in Santa Fe, New Mexico.

References 

1950s births
Living people
21st-century American judges
New Mexico Democrats
Justices of the New Mexico Supreme Court
New Mexico State University alumni
University of New Mexico alumni
Women chief justices of state supreme courts in the United States
Year of birth missing (living people)
21st-century American women judges